The Greenwood Mennonite School has the distinction of being the oldest Mennonite elementary school in continuous operation. It began in March 1928 after the Mennonite students were expelled from the Greenwood public school for refusing, on grounds of conscience, to salute and pledge allegiance to the American flag.

References 

Mennonite schools